Ravna Banja is a village in the municipality of Medveđa, Serbia. According to the 2002 census, the village has a population of 364 people. Of these, 205 (56,31 %) were Serbs, 153 (42,03 %) were ethnic Albanians, 1 (0,27 %) Montenegrin, 1 (0,27 %) Bulgarian, and 4 others.

References

Populated places in Jablanica District
Medveđa
Albanian communities in Serbia